Alexey Dmitrievitch Savrasenko (alternate spelling: Alexei) (born February 28, 1979) is a retired Russian-Greek professional basketball player. He played at the center position.

Because of half-Greek origin from his mother's side, he has dual citizenship in both Russia and Greece. In fact, his Greek passport states his name as Alexis Amanatidis (Greek: Αλέξης Αμανατίδης).

Professional career
In June 2011, Savrasenko signed a one-year contract with UNICS Kazan. On August 24, 2012, Savrasenko reached a one-year deal with Lokomotiv Kuban Krasnodar. He retired from professional basketball at the end of the 2012–13 season.

National team career
As a member of the senior men's Russian national basketball team, Savrasenko played at the 2002 FIBA World Championship. He also played at the following FIBA EuroBaskets: FIBA EuroBasket 2001, FIBA EuroBasket 2003, FIBA EuroBasket 2005, and FIBA EuroBasket 2007.  He won the gold medal at the FIBA EuroBasket 2007.

Awards and achievements

Pro clubs
2× Greek League Champion: (1996, 1997)
2× Greek Cup Winner: (1997, 2002)
3× EuroLeague Champion: (1997, 2006, 2008)
2× Triple Crown Champion: (1997, 2006)
6× Russian Championship Champion: (2003, 2004, 2005, 2006, 2007, 2008)
3× Russian Cup Winner: (2005, 2006, 2007)
Russian Cup MVP: (2007)
EuroCup Champion: (2013)

Russian senior national team
 FIBA EuroBasket 2007:

References

External links
Euroleague.net Profile
FIBA Euroleague Profile
Eurobasket.com Profile

1979 births
Living people
Basketball players at the 2008 Summer Olympics
BC Dynamo Moscow players
BC Khimki players
BC Spartak Saint Petersburg players
BC UNICS players
Centers (basketball)
Greek men's basketball players
Greek Basket League players
Greek people of Russian descent
Naturalized citizens of Greece
Olympiacos B.C. players
Olympic basketball players of Russia
PBC CSKA Moscow players
PBC Lokomotiv-Kuban players
Peristeri B.C. players
Russian men's basketball players
2002 FIBA World Championship players
Sportspeople from Krasnodar